Manis Lamond (born 14 September 1966) is a retired soccer player from Papua New Guinea. An international who played as a striker, Lamond played professionally in Australia for Canberra City, Sydney United, A.P.I.A. Leichhardt Tigers, Wollongong City, Marconi Stallions and Newcastle United and in Singapore for Sembawang Rangers.

References

1966 births
Living people
Papua New Guinean footballers
Papua New Guinea international footballers
Papua New Guinean expatriate footballers
National Soccer League (Australia) players
APIA Leichhardt FC players
Marconi Stallions FC players
Sydney United 58 FC players
Wollongong Wolves FC players
Expatriate soccer players in Australia
Papua New Guinean expatriate sportspeople in Australia
Expatriate footballers in Singapore
Sembawang Rangers FC players
Singapore Premier League players
Association football forwards